The Missouri Republican Party is the affiliate of the United States Republican Party in Missouri. Its chair is Nick Myers, who has served since 2021. It is currently the dominant party in the state, controlling the majority of Missouri's U.S. House seats, both U.S. Senate seats, both houses of the state legislature, and all statewide offices, including the governorship.

Current Republican officeholders

Members of Congress

U.S. Senate
Josh Hawley
Eric Schmitt

U.S. House of Representatives
Ann Wagner, 2nd District
Blaine Luetkemeyer, 3rd District
Mark Alford, 4th District
Sam Graves, 6th District
Eric Burlison, 7th District
Jason T. Smith, 8th District

Statewide offices
 Governor: Mike Parson
 Lieutenant Governor: Mike Kehoe
 Attorney General: Andrew Bailey
 Secretary of State: Jay Ashcroft
 State Auditor: Scott Fitzpatrick
 State Treasurer: Vivek Malek

References

External links

Missouri College Republicans

Political parties in Missouri
Missouri